Maryann Brandon A.C.E., is an American television and film editor. She is a frequent collaborator with J. J. Abrams.

Brandon earned a Primetime Emmy Award nomination for her editing work on the popular television series Alias, created by Abrams. Brandon was also an associate producer on Alias during its final season. She has since edited almost all of Abrams' films with Mary Jo Markey, with Star Wars: The Rise of Skywalker being the lone exception, as she edited that film with Stefan Grube. Brandon worked with Abrams on Star Wars: The Force Awakens, which was released in December 2015. She received an Academy Award nomination for Best Film Editing for her work on the film, sharing the nomination with Mary Jo Markey.

In her role editing Abrams' Star Trek, she reported that neither editor had been told that he intended to make extensive use of lens flares and bright lighting, and they initially contacted the film developers asking why the film seemed overexposed.

Partial filmography
 Bingo – 1991
 The Birds II: Land's End – 1994
 Born to Be Wild – 1995
 Grumpier Old Men – 1995 (co-edited with Seth Flaum and Billy Weber)
 A Thousand Acres – 1997
 The Miracle Worker – 2000
 Alias – 2001–05
 Mission: Impossible III – 2006 (co-edited with Mary Jo Markey)
 The Jane Austen Book Club – 2007
 Star Trek – 2009 (co-edited with Mary Jo Markey)
 How to Train Your Dragon – 2010 (co-edited with Darren T. Holmes)
 Super 8 – 2011 (co-edited with Mary Jo Markey)
 Kung Fu Panda 2 – 2011 (co-edited with Clare Knight)
 Star Trek Into Darkness – 2013 (co-edited with Mary Jo Markey)
 Endless Love – 2014
 Star Wars: The Force Awakens – 2015 (co-edited with Mary Jo Markey)
 Passengers – 2016
 The Darkest Minds – 2018
 Venom – 2018 (co-edited with Alan Baumgarten)
 Star Wars: The Rise of Skywalker – 2019 (co-edited with Stefan Grube)
 Venom: Let There Be Carnage – 2021 (co-edited with Stan Salfas)
 Magic Mike's Last Dance – 2023

References

External links
 
 Official resume at Innovative Artists

American film editors
American Cinema Editors
Year of birth missing (living people)
Living people
American women film editors